Stade de Reims won Division 1 season 1954/1955 of the French Association Football League with 44 points.

Participating teams

 Bordeaux
 RC Lens
 Lille OSC
 Olympique Lyonnais
 Olympique de Marseille
 FC Metz
 AS Monaco
 FC Nancy
 OGC Nice
 Nîmes Olympique
 RC Paris
 Stade de Reims
 CO Roubaix-Tourcoing
 AS Saint-Etienne
 FC Sochaux-Montbéliard
 RC Strasbourg
 Toulouse FC
 AS Troyes-Savinienne

Final table

Promoted from Division 2, who will play in Division 1 season 1955/1956
 UA Sedan-Torcy:Champion of Division 2

Results

Top goalscorers

References
 Division 1 season 1954-1955 at pari-et-gagne.com

Ligue 1 seasons
French
1